Thomas Windsor (by 1517-c.1567) was an English politician.

Thomas Windsor may also refer to:

Thomas Windsor, 1st Viscount Windsor (c.1670–1738), English soldier, landowner and politician
Thomas Hickman-Windsor, 1st Earl of Plymouth (c.1627–1687)

See also
Tom Winsor (born 1957), British civil servant